The gelo di melone ("gelu di muluni" in Sicilian, also known as gelo d'anguria) is a typical Sicilian dessert, traditionally prepared in Ferragosto, Italy. A jellied watermelon pudding, it is also popular for the Saint Rosalia celebrations in Palermo.

It is commonly considered an inheritance of Arab influence, and a dessert derived from the Persian fālūdhaj. Basic ingredients are watermelon pulp, sugar (or honey) and starch, while pistachios, candied fruit, cinnamon and rose water are often added.

See also

 Italian cuisine
 Sicilian cuisine  
 List of Sicilian dishes

References

  
Cuisine of Sicily
Italian desserts
Puddings
Melon dishes